Gerald Ryan may refer to:

Gerald J. Ryan (1887–1917), Australian rules footballer
Gerald P. Ryan (1895–1974), Australian rules footballer
Gerald Augustine John Ryan, American bishop

See also
Gerry Ryan (disambiguation)